Lucca railway station serves the city and comune of Lucca,  in the region of Tuscany, central Italy.  Opened in 1846, it forms part of the Viareggio–Florence railway, and is also the junction for lines to Pisa and to Aulla. All of these lines are only served by regional trains.

The station is currently managed by Rete Ferroviaria Italiana (RFI).  However, the commercial area of the passenger building is managed by Centostazioni.  Train services to and from the station are operated by Trenitalia.  Each of these companies is a subsidiary of Ferrovie dello Stato (FS), Italy's state-owned rail company.

Location
Lucca railway station is situated at Piazza Ricasoli, on the southern edge of the city centre.

Features

Passenger building
The passenger building was designed by the engineer Enrico Pohlmeyer and the architect Vincenzo Pardini, who created the elevations.  It was inaugurated on 29 September 1846.

The elegant and refined façade includes a double row of arches that lightens the structure. Although it has undergone some changes over the years, these have not diminished the original nineteenth-century building.

Inside the passenger building are a bar, toilets, an office for the rail police, a ticket office and, in front of the building, parking and a stop for taxis and buses.

Station yard
The station yard has six tracks, including five loops used for passenger service, and three sidings.

Track 1 has a platform for trains to and from Media Valle del Serchio, Garfagnana and Lunigiana.  Track 2 is for passing goods trains.  The passenger trains stopping at the platform facing track 3 are from Florence and heading towards Viareggio.  The platform facing track 4 is for trains from Viareggio towards Florence.  Tracks 5 and 6 are used by trains heading to the hill towns, to Pisa and to Florence.

Siding tracks 1 and 2 west are used as the terminus of the lines to Pisa and Viareggio.  Siding track 3 east is the terminus of the line to Florence.

Passenger and train movements
Passenger traffic is very heavy at all hours of the day, especially in the morning and evening, when the station is crowded with commuters.  In summer, the station is often the focal point of the entire province of Lucca for tourists and people heading to Viareggio.

All trains passing through the station are bound for various regional destinations, of which the most important are Florence, Aulla, Viareggio and Pisa.  The station also has one train a day for Livorno, and a daily bus to Pisa Aeroporto.

Gallery

See also

History of rail transport in Italy
List of railway stations in Tuscany
Rail transport in Italy
Railway stations in Italy

External links

This article is based upon a translation of the Italian language version as at December 2011.

Railway stations in Tuscany
Railway stations opened in 1846
Railway station
1846 establishments in the Duchy of Lucca
Railway stations in Italy opened in 1846